Günther Babel (born 26 September 1952 in Wassertrüdingen) is a German politician, representative of the Christian Social Union of Bavaria. Between 2003 and 2008 he was a member of the Landtag of Bavaria. In March 2008 Babel was elected mayor of the town Wassertrüdingen.

See also
List of Bavarian Christian Social Union politicians

References

Christian Social Union in Bavaria politicians
1952 births
Living people